Gao Chengyong (10 November 1964 – 3 January 2019) was a Chinese serial killer and rapist. He mutilated the corpses of his victims, leading to his nickname of the "Chinese Jack the Ripper" in Chinese media. He is thought to have killed eleven women between 1988 and 2002.

Sentenced to death and stripped of all his assets, he was executed by an undisclosed method in January 2019.

Murders 
Over the course of 14 years, Gao raped, murdered and mutilated eleven women: nine in Baiyin, Gansu province, and two in Baotou, Inner Mongolia. His youngest victim was eight years old. The first murder is thought to have originated in a grocery store he managed with his wife in Baiyin. He would normally operate in daytime and follow his victims home, where he would strike.

Gao raped his victims sometimes while they were alive and sometimes after having stabbed them to death. He removed the reproductive organs of some women after killing them and cut the hands and breasts off of at least one of his victims, leading to the media comparing him to the unidentified serial killer Jack the Ripper, who committed at least five murders in the East End of London in the 1880s. He also robbed his victims.

Gao's wife stated that she noticed that her husband would disappear from the house for days at a time; however she never suspected him to be a serial killer. Because he always came home with money, she assumed that he had left to do casual work.

Arrest, sentencing and execution 
Police linked the eleven murders for the first time in 2004 and offered a reward of 200,000 yuan. Gao avoided capture until his uncle was arrested for an unrelated, minor offence. During a routine DNA test, a close familial relationship to the killer was established. Gao was subsequently arrested at the grocery store where he worked in Baiyin on 26 August 2016. According to the Ministry of Public Security, he confessed to the eleven murders. Gao was sentenced to death and stripped of all his assets on 30 March 2018, and was executed on 3 January 2019; the method of execution used was not disclosed.

Personal life 
Gao was married and had two children. He was from Qingcheng Town, Yuzhong County, Lanzhou, Gansu.

See also 
 List of serial killers by number of victims

References 

1964 births
1988 murders in Asia
2002 murders in Asia
2019 deaths
20th-century Chinese criminals
21st-century Chinese criminals
21st-century executions by China
Chinese male criminals
Chinese people convicted of murder
Chinese people convicted of rape
Chinese people convicted of robbery
Chinese rapists
Executed Chinese serial killers
Executed people from Gansu
Male serial killers
Necrophiles
People convicted of murder by China
People executed by China
People executed for murder
People from Lanzhou
Violence against women in China